Texaco Service Station may refer to:

• DeVille's Historic Texaco Station , circa     1935, 1 Locust street, Knowlton , NJ 07832

Harvey's Grocery and Texaco Station, Camden, Arkansas, listed on the National Register of Historic Places (NRHP)
Rison Texaco Service Station, Rison, Arkansas, NRHP-listed
Texaco Station No. 1, Paragould, Arkansas, NRHP-listed
Ambler's Texaco Gas Station, Dwight, Illinois, NRHP-listed
Deerfield Texaco Service Station, Deerfield, Kansas, NRHP-listed
Dave's Texaco, Chinook, Montana, NRHP-listed
Texaco Service Station (Bristow, Oklahoma), NRHP-listed